Doucette is an unincorporated community in central Tyler County, Texas, United States.  It lies along U.S. Route 69 north of the town of Woodville, the county seat of Tyler County. Although Doucette is unincorporated, it has a post office, with the ZIP code of 75942.

References

Unincorporated communities in Tyler County, Texas
Unincorporated communities in Texas